Kgaogelo Rathete Sekgota (born 22 June 1997), nicknamed Kigi, is a South African soccer player who plays as a winger for Kaizer Chiefs.

Club career
Sekgota is a youth product of the academy of Polokwane United, having joined in 2012. Sekgota began his senior career with the Lithuanian club Stumbras in 2017, and moved to Vitória in January 2019. Sekgota made his professional debut for Vitória in a 2-0 Primeira Liga loss to FC Porto on 16 February 2019.

Sekgota returned to South Africa and joined Bidvest Wits on 17 January 2020. He was announced as new Kaizer Chiefs player following the upliftment of the team transfer ban on 9 July 2021.

International
He made his South Africa national football team debut on 4 June 2019, in a 2019 COSAFA Cup plate semi-final against Uganda, as a 73rd-minute substitute for Kamohelo Mahlatsi.

Honours
Stumbras
 Lithuanian Football Cup (1): 2017
Individual
 A Lyga Young Player of the Month: May 2018

References

External links
Twitter Profile
Soccerway Profile
Stumbras Profile

1997 births
Living people
People from Capricorn District Municipality
South African soccer players
South Africa international soccer players
Association football wingers
Vitória F.C. players
FC Stumbras players
Bidvest Wits F.C. players
Moroka Swallows F.C. players
Kaizer Chiefs F.C. players
Primeira Liga players
A Lyga players
South African Premier Division players
South African expatriate soccer players
South African expatriate sportspeople in Portugal
Expatriate footballers in Portugal
South African expatriate sportspeople in Lithuania
Expatriate footballers in Lithuania
Sportspeople from Limpopo